The 1730s decade ran from January 1, 1730, to December 31, 1739.

References